The Charleston Sofa Super Store fire disaster occurred on the evening of June 18, 2007, in Charleston, South Carolina, and killed nine firefighters. This was the deadliest firefighter disaster in the US since the September 11 attacks. Though the fire was believed to have started in some discarded furniture in the loading dock area, the exact source of ignition remains undetermined.

Fire and collapse

The fire occurred at the Sofa Super Store, composed of a 42,000 ft² (3,902 m²) single-story steel trussed showroom building with a 17,000 ft² (1,579 m²) warehouse building located behind the retail space, located at 1807 Savannah Highway in Charleston. The building had no fire sprinkler system. Sofa Super Store had set up shop there in 1992. The fire started at approximately 7:00 p.m. in a covered loading dock area built between the showroom and warehouse buildings which was attached to both buildings. At the time, the business was open and employees were present. Charleston firefighters arrived on the scene within three minutes of the alarm, followed soon after by firefighters from the St. Andrews Public Service District.

The initial attack focused on extinguishing the fire in the loading dock area, with a secondary effort to search for and evacuate people inside, and prevent the fire from spreading to the showroom and warehouse. Crews entering the showroom reportedly initially encountered clear visibility with only very light puffs of smoke visible near the ceiling at the back of the showroom. Shortly thereafter, an exterior door was opened near where the fire was raging. Efforts to close the door failed, allowing the fire to enter the showroom. Firefighters were ordered to stretch two hose lines into the showroom to attack the spreading fire; however, the pre-connected hose line from one of the units was too short. This required some firefighters to again exit the building to add additional sections of hose, and left only one small handline to hold back the growing fire. At about this time, fire dispatchers advised the crews on-scene that they had received a 9-1-1 call from an employee who was trapped in the warehouse, which required some firefighters to direct their attention to the rescue. The trapped employee was eventually rescued by firefighters who breached an exterior wall to reach him.<ref
name="newseek"></ref>

Despite efforts to confine and extinguish the fire, it continued to spread into the structure and ignited furniture in the showroom, growing more quickly than the few operating hose lines could control. Meanwhile, efforts to stretch and begin operating additional hose lines continued. At 7:41 p.m. the showroom area of the store experienced a flashover while at least sixteen firefighters were working inside. The flashover contributed to the rapid deterioration of the structural integrity of the building, leading to a near-complete collapse of the roof minutes later. Many of the firefighters caught in the flashover were unable to escape and were trapped under the collapsed roof and shelving weakened by the fast-spreading fire. Several calls for help were made by trapped firefighters and efforts to rescue them were commenced. These efforts proved unsuccessful. By the time the fire was brought under control, nine Charleston firefighters had been killed.

The Sofa Super Store site was on a major business and commuter artery feeding the suburbs and shopping centers of Charleston. Car traffic continued unabated for many critical minutes in the initial stages of the fire, driving over water supply lines and contributing to severe water supply problems, as the supply lines snaked from hydrants in surrounding blocks up to a half-mile away from the center of the fire. Eventually automobile traffic on Savannah Highway was stopped so water pressure would be more consistent, the traffic diversion causing surrounding neighborhoods to fill with stranded commuters and onlookers. As the fire diminished and appeared contained, nearing 11:00 PM, surrounding neighborhoods began to clear and onlookers departed, most unaware of the loss of life during the blaze.

According to Charleston County Coroner Rae Wooten, the firefighters died of a combination of smoke inhalation and burns, but not from injuries sustained from the collapse itself. It was the greatest single loss of firefighters in the United States since 343 firefighters were killed in the collapse of the World Trade Center in the September 11, 2001 attacks. It was also the deadliest fire in South Carolina since a fire that killed eleven people at the Lancaster County jail in 1979.

Timeline
7:08 p.m. – First call reporting the fire is received.
7:09 p.m. – Dispatched units: Charleston Fire Department Engine 10, Engine 11, Ladder 5 and Battalion 4.
7:10 p.m. – Battalion 4 arrives on scene. Dispatched units: Charleston Fire Department Engine 16 and Car 2.
7:11 p.m. – Engine 11 arrives first and reports a trash and debris fire that is up against the wall in the loading dock area, but that they have not yet entered the building to check for extension. Engine 10 and Car 2 arrive.
7:12 p.m. – Ladder 5 arrives. Engine 12 is dispatched.
7:13 p.m. – Engine 15 is dispatched. (approximate) Fire crews enter the showroom building and find no obvious fire; however, some light smoke is visible near the ceiling tiles near where the fire burns outside. A door leading from the showroom to the loading dock area is opened by the Incident Commander, and the force of the fire pulls the door out of his hand. The inrush of oxygen feeds the fire and makes it impossible to close the door. Fire enters the showroom.
7:14 p.m. – The Incident Commander reports fire in the showroom.
7:15 p.m. – Engine 16 arrives and enters the showroom to join Ladder 5's crew attacking the fire from inside. Engine 19 is dispatched.
7:16 p.m. – Charleston Fire Chief Rusty Thomas (Car 1) arrives, several off-duty firefighters also begin to arrive. Engine 6 is dispatched. Inadequate water supply begins to be a problem, which is compounded by some hoses being run over by passing vehicles.
7:17 p.m. – Engine 12 and Engine 15 arrive.
7:20 p.m. – Engine 19 arrives. Problems continue with the water supply.
7:21 p.m. – Engine 6 arrives.
7:24 p.m. – Battalion 5 arrives. St. Andrew Car 3 (from neighboring St. Andrews Public Service District) decided on their own to respond and soon request more help from St. Andrews crews.
7:25 p.m. – St. Andrews Engine 2 and St. Andrews Rescue 1 arrive.
7:26 p.m. – An employee of the Sofa Super Store calls 911 and reports that he is trapped in the warehouse building. The crew from St. Andrews is notified of the trapped employee and attempts to locate him from the outside.
7:29 p.m. – (approximate) The trapped employee is rescued when the St. Andrews firefighters breach an exterior wall and pull him out of the building.
7:31 p.m. – The first firefighters in the building have been breathing from their air bottles for approximately eighteen minutes and will soon run out of air. Conditions in the showroom continue to worsen while at least sixteen firefighters continue to work inside. Engine 3 is dispatched.
7:32 p.m. – A firefighter inside calls "Mayday!" over his radio. Soon after, another voice on the radio is heard to say "Car One (Chief Thomas). Please tell my wife that ... 'I love you.'" Another firefighter inside is heard on the radio saying "...in Jesus's name, amen." Chief Thomas orders his commanders to account for their crews and is told that some firefighters remain inside. One firefighter attempting to escape is trapped behind the large glass in front of the showroom, and is freed when someone smashes it as other crews prepare to enter the building to rescue firefighters in distress. An emergency alert is activated on the radio of Ladder 5's engineer, who is inside, but calls to that radio go unanswered. Several PASS devices worn by firefighters are heard, meaning that firefighters in distress have manually activated them or have been motionless for at least 30 seconds. Firefighters begin smashing all of the glass in front of the store to allow escaping firefighters out and rescuing firefighters in, but this allows large amounts of oxygen to reach the fire, which quickly begins to grow in intensity.
7:38 p.m. – Chief Thomas orders a full evacuation.
7:40 p.m. – Engine 3 arrives.
7:41 p.m. – (approximate) A flashover occurs. Virtually all of the interior of the showroom building erupts in fire within seconds. Chaotic radio traffic now ties up the radio channels, but calls about water supply problems continue. A final, unsuccessful attempt at rescue is made but quickly forced back by the intensity of the fire.
7:45 p.m. – The front of the showroom building collapses, sending a fireball and smoke plume out the front of the building, over the heads of fleeing firefighters and showering hundreds of onlookers with ash and debris. Fire then shoots 30 feet (9 m) into the air as much of the rest of the structure collapses.
10:00 p.m. – (approximate) After the fire is brought under control, the remains of two of the firefighters' bodies are found near the center of the building.
10:45 p.m. – (approximate) Charleston Mayor Joe Riley announces that several firefighters remain missing.
11:00 p.m. – (approximate) The bodies of two more firefighters are located about 30 feet (9 m) from the first group.
11:15 p.m. – (approximate) Three firefighters' bodies are found at the South end of the building.
4:00 a.m. – (approximate) The remaining two missing firefighters are located at the northeast corner of the building.

Fallen

Investigations

About fifty investigators in all were assigned to the investigation, including the City of Charleston Police Department, the Charleston County Sheriff's Office, the South Carolina State Law Enforcement Division, and the ATF national response team. The ATF confirmed on June 23 that the fire originated in the covered loading dock area situated between the showroom and warehouse buildings, in a pile of trash near an area where employees were known to take smoking breaks. Neither of the destroyed buildings had sprinklers, nor were they required by local codes to have them.

The South Carolina Department of Labor, Licensing and Regulation will investigate the Charleston Fire Department's procedures and training in light of the deaths. The National Institute for Occupational Safety and Health (NIOSH), as always when a firefighter line-of-duty-death occurs, is expected to conduct an independent investigation of the incident. The National Institute of Standards and Technology (NIST) assisted NIOSH by reconstructing the fire with a computer simulation.

On Monday, July 2, 2007, Chief Rusty Thomas told the CDC (which oversees NIOSH, the federal department that investigates firefighter fatalities) that his department would not allow federal investigators to interview firefighters about the Sofa Super Store fire. On Tuesday, July 3, 2007, the head of NIOSH wrote to Chief Thomas, asking him to reconsider. On Thursday, July 5, 2007, the city relented when Mayor Joe Riley called the CDC to say that interviews would be allowed. CDC spokesman Fred Blosser, in an interview with MSNBC, said, "This is a developing situation. This morning we were notified that the chief has said that he will grant access to the firefighters. Earlier this week, he had indicated that he was denying access to the firefighters for interviews." Mayor Riley replied that it was all a misunderstanding. He said that Chief Thomas was merely trying to minimize the number of interviews of his weary and grieving firefighters, not to block any investigation.

The U.S. Fire Administration also investigated the fire, to incorporate lessons into the curriculum at the National Fire Academy.

Charleston panel

A panel of outside experts was convened by the City of Charleston to examine the city's fire department and its handling of the fire. The panel included Gordon Routley, Kevin Roche, Tim Sendelbach, Brian Crawford, Mike Chiramonte, and Pete Piringer. Mayor Joe Riley stated that the panel's work was divided into three parts. The team's first step was to conduct an "intense diagnostic analysis" of the fire department and its practices and procedures. The mayor indicated this phase would only take about a month, and any recommendations will be acted on immediately. The second step would compile reports from local, state, and federal investigators into one report the city could work from, to last approximately four months. The last step was to create a long-term strategic plan to chart a future course for the city's fire department.

Brian Crawford, in an interview with KTBS-TV News, said, "That report is going to lend so much information to other fire departments across the country who may be operating the same way that Charleston was. It may have them step back and look at their own organizations."

The six-person panel came out with a list of initial recommendations in less than a week. Speaking of the recommended changes, Gordon Routley said, "I think there are areas that are significant firefighter safety issues that, to us, need to be implemented as soon as possible."

The initial changes recommended by the panel include:
Establishing a Deputy Chief/Assistant to the Chief position
Establishing a Fire Department Safety Officer position
Establishing a Public Information Officer
Having a minimum of two dispatchers on duty at all times
Maintaining a minimum staffing of three on-duty firefighters at all times on all existing engine and ladder companies
An incremental movement over two years to achieve four on-duty firefighters on all fire companies
Applying appropriate incident command procedures on all incidents
Reinforcing appropriate use of personal protective clothing and SCBA
Reinforcing the use of seat belts and standard emergency response vehicular operations
Ensuring that "2-in/2-out" is followed at all times
Developing management procedures for off-duty firefighters that respond to emergencies
Implementing Incident Command and tactical operations training for all officers
Providing training for firefighter safety and survival, risk management, air management, lost/disoriented firefighters, rapid intervention operations, objective-based tactical operations, and other critical firefighter safety procedures
Providing incident safety officer training for all command officers and health and safety officer training to selected personnel
Assuring that all new firefighters are trained and certified to the Firefighter II level before assignment to emergency duty, with South Carolina Fire Academy support
Increasing the initial response to a structure fire to three engines and a ladder, with the third engine as the Rapid Intervention Team (RIT)
Responding the Assistant Chief, a second Battalion Chief, a fourth engine company, and an ambulance to a confirmed working structure fire
Utilizing the second-arriving Battalion Chief as the Safety Officer unless a staff Safety Officer is already on scene
Eliminating 10-codes and using designated tactical channels for major incidents
Changing to large-diameter supply hose
Using a minimum of 1½" hose for fire attack and standardizing nozzle configurations

SLED inquiry
In early 2010, Charleston area solicitor Scarlett Wilson requested a SLED (South Carolina Law Enforcement Division) inquiry into the fire to determine if criminal charges should be pursued. After an initial inquiry, SLED returned a statement that the fire "does not meet the criteria for a SLED criminal investigation."

Criticism
The City of Charleston refused help from the International Association of Fire Fighters (IAFF) and International Association of Fire Chiefs (IAFC) in planning the memorial, which exacerbated tensions between the IAFF and South Carolina Firefighters' Association (SCFA). The IAFF's General President Harold Schaitberger has charged that Mayor Joseph Riley and Fire Chief Rusty Thomas are not "labor friendly" and that Charleston is an "openly anti-union city".

The International Association of Fire Fighters (IAFF) and other fire safety experts, including Roger L. Yow, president of the Charleston Firefighters Association and a former captain with 25 years of service in the department, have been critical of the manner in which the fire was handled. Union officials and other fire safety experts claim the City of Charleston Fire Department did not follow procedures consistent with the National Incident Management System. South Carolina governor Mark Sanford directed all state and local emergency response agencies to adopt the system in 2005. Acting state fire marshal John Reich said the state does not inspect the operating procedures of fire departments, but they assume that departments are following guidelines prescribed in the National Incident Management System. Some fire safety experts have also questioned why so many firefighters were in a burning building with a steel truss roof, which is known to be a serious safety hazard for firefighters. A routine fire preplan of the structure in June 2006 made no mention of its roof construction, and it has been suggested that CFD firefighters did not pull the ceiling to check for extension into the roof structure.

In a telephone interview with The Charlotte Observer, Charleston Mayor Joe Riley responded to critics by saying, "I have absolute confidence in our procedures and in the leadership."

Chief Thomas and some firefighters with the City of Charleston dismiss critics as outsiders who don't understand the realities of fighting fires in a dense city full of historic buildings. However, the fire occurred in a suburban district miles from the historic downtown, where the main exposures were one story ranch houses. The Post and Courier has quoted Chief Thomas as saying "Our firefighting techniques are not going to change in the City of Charleston Fire Department [...] We're safe, we've got the best equipment, we've got the best people and that's the way we fight fires." Chief Thomas has indicated that his men performed just as they were trained, and he wouldn't do anything differently if the same fire happened again. Greg Hambrick, reporting for the Charleston City Paper questioned the chief's reply. "It was an odd response considering a very hush-hush investigation is ongoing and Riley had said several times since the fire that lessons would be learned. Considering nine guys walked into the fire and didn't come out, there must be something that could protect our firefighters next time." Charleston mayoral candidate Dudley Gregorie, referring to the incident, said "To keep doing things the same way, and expecting different results, is insanity."

Some fire experts have questioned why the exterior front windows were taken out by firefighters while crews were committed inside, an action that could have increased the amount of oxygen being fed to the fire and drawn flames to the front of the store. Assistant Fire Chief Larry Garvin stated that fire blew out the windows, at which time firefighters broke open more windows to allow firefighters to escape.

Questions were also raised about the Charleston Fire Department's use of booster lines to fight the fire. The smaller booster lines are less effective against very large fires, and offer less protection to firefighters when flames get out of control. Chief Thomas has said that he doesn't know who pulled the booster lines that could be seen in photographs and videos of the fire, but he doubts that they extended more than  inside the structure, and he insists none were used to fight the fire inside.

Analysis of photographs and video also raised concerns about firefighters, including chief officers, who were not utilizing personal protective equipment appropriately. Some firefighters were wearing street clothes, while others had open coats or were missing helmets. Some firefighters could be seen walking through toxic smoke without air packs. Fire Chief Rusty Thomas has indicated that everyone inside the structure, including the nine fallen firefighters, were wearing the appropriate protective equipment.

Although thermal imaging cameras were available on the scene, they were not used in the scene size-up or to help find victims.

Memorials

A public memorial service for the fallen firefighters took place on Friday, June 22, 2007, at the North Charleston Coliseum in North Charleston. A procession of more than 300 fire engines, ladder trucks, ambulances, and command vehicles which stretched approximately 7.5 miles (12 km) long moved single file along a route which passed each of the three fire stations from which firefighters were lost as well as past the site of the fatal fire, while some bystanders, police officers, and ATF agents paid their respects by saluting or holding their hands over their hearts. The procession then moved along Interstate 526 to the North Charleston Coliseum. An estimated 30,000 people, including as many as 8,000 firefighters representing over 700 emergency services agencies from around the country attended the gathering.

The largest of several funds established for the families of the fallen firefighters raised nearly $1.2 million to benefit the families of the fallen firefighters. This figure does not include an additional $100,000 donated by the Leary Firefighters Foundation, nor several other funds established since the incident. In addition, Sofa Super Store owner Herb Goldstein established the Charleston Nine Scholarship Endowment with a startup donation of $100,000, which will help defray the costs of college tuition for first responders and to children or dependents of both first responders currently serving and those who have lost their lives in the line of duty. Other shops and businesses around the city also accepted donations or contributed a portion of their sales towards the families of the fallen firefighters.

Numerous firefighters from the area accepted an offer from a local tattoo parlor, which employed a St. Andrews firefighter who escaped the collapse, to receive a free tattoo memorializing the lost Charleston firefighters. Firefighters were invited to choose from several memorial designs created specifically as remembrances of the lost firefighters.

Mayor Joe Riley announced on June 27, 2007, that the City of Charleston had reached a tentative agreement with Sofa Super Store owner Herb Goldstein to turn the site of the tragedy into a park with a memorial for the nine fallen firefighters. The following day, Riley proposed a second memorial be included in a planned, but controversial, county park. "It could be where every firefighter in the region goes for their picnic," Riley said. The second memorial has been criticized as a move to garner support for the county park project.

On March 25, 2008, it was announced that South Carolina state lawmakers had approved a bill to name a 3.6 mile stretch of U.S. Route 17 in honor of the fallen Charleston firefighters. The designated section, to be named the "Charleston Nine Memorial Highway", runs from the intersection with S.C. Highway 171 to Sam Rittenberg Boulevard and includes the site of the fire.

The Summerville High School basketball team, of which Captain Louis Mulkey was an assistant coach, was presented with a custom memorial fire helmet by the Charleston Fire Department. The team placed the helmet on the bench for each of the team's games in the 2007–08 season. Summerville went on to win its first-ever state basketball championship.

In 2008, the Coastal Carolina Council of the Boy Scouts of America sold a patch that commemorated the Charleston Nine.

Memorials are held annually in Charleston on the anniversary of the fire.

Reactions

See also
 Fire Fighter Fatality Investigation and Prevention Program
 National Fire Fighter Near-Miss Reporting System
 Leary Firefighters Foundation

References

External links

 Fire Fighter Fatality Investigation and Prevention Program Report – NIOSH report on the incident.
Charleston Fire Department 
 Charleston Fire Discussed at Firehouse WorldFirehouse.com, Accessed February 6, 2008.

Media
 
 
 
 Video: IAFF Press Conference – Local members of the IAFF talk about the incident
 "Summerville Remembers Fallen Coach Louis Mulkey," ESPN, June 2, 2008. Accessed June 17, 2008.

2007 fires in the United States
2007 in South Carolina
June 2007 events in the United States
Disasters in South Carolina
History of Charleston, South Carolina
Building and structure fires in the United States
Warehouse fires
Fires in South Carolina